The Mediterranean Technology Park (PMT) is a science and technology park located in Castelldefels, a town in the Baix Llobregat county, in Catalonia, 10 minutes from the airport and 20 minutes from the centre of Barcelona.

Overview

The park is a joint initiative between:
Castelldefels City Council
Generalitat of Catalonia
Regional Council of Baix Llobregat
Technical University of Catalonia (UPC)

The PMT is a nerve centre for research and innovation that aims to create relations between:
Companies with a high technology content
Research centres
Technology-based spin-off companies
University schools (Baix Llobregat Campus of UPC)

The PMT is a multi-disciplinary environment that fosters the following fields:
Aeronautics and Space Engineering
Bioengineering, Agro-Food Engineering and Biotechnology
Geo-Information Technologies
Information and Communication Technologies
Numerical Methods in Engineering
Photonic Technologies

The MTP and Baix Llobregat Campus were opened for the 2001–2002 academic year. So far, 2 University schools, 20 research groups, 8 research centres, and 4 business initiatives involved in technological innovation have been located in the PMT

The PMT has a Technology incubator, a Documentation Centre and Library, Auditorium and meeting rooms and high quality infrastructures.

Future
In 2009, it will open a university residence and the REDIT building (Research+ Development+ Technological Innovation), that will cover a total area of 10,000 m2 and will be suitable for the following activities:
R&D activities carried out by multinationals or large-scale national companies
Small and medium companies that carry out extensive R&D or innovation activities
Groups that offer the following types of services: legal, fiscal, marketing, financing, quality control
University research groups with competitive funding
Public research centres promoted by the university and/or the Regional Government
Joint projects between private companies and university groups or research centres
Spin-off companies created by the university and public research centres

External links
Mediterranean Technology Park
XPCAT: Network of Science and Technology Parks of Catalonia
APTE: Association of Science and Technology Parks of Spain
IASP: International Association of Science Parks

Science parks in Catalonia